Pouteria minima is a species of plant in the family Sapotaceae. It is endemic to Brazil.

References

Flora of Brazil
minima
Endangered plants
Taxonomy articles created by Polbot
Plants described in 1990